Winfred Nyiva Mwendwa is a Kenyan politician. She was the first Kenyan woman to serve as a cabinet minister.

Early life and education 
She was educated at Alliance Girls High School. She was elected for the post of Kitui West Constituency MP three times, in 1974 and 1992 representing KANU and in 2002 representing NARC. At the 2007 elections she contested the seat on the ODM-Kenya ticket, but lost to Charles Mutisya Nyamai. She was elected the first Kitui County woman representative in the 2013 Kitui local elections on a Wiper Democratic Movement-Kenya (WDM-K) ticket. In 2016, she announced her intention to retire from active politics 40 years since her debut.

Political life 
Mwendwa was appointed the Minister for Culture and Social Services on May 9, 1995, becoming the first female minister in Kenya.

She caused a national disfavour in 1995 when she travelled to women’s conference in Beijing in 1995 and took a hairdresser as a part of her delegation. Mwendwa herself defended the decision by stating that being a delegation leader, she must take care of her appearance.

Her husband Kitili Maluki Mwendwa was Kenyan chief justice and politician. Kitili Mwendwa died in a traffic accident in 1985. He was at the time the Kitui West MP, his seat was taken at the subsequent by-election by his brother Kyale Mwendwa. His other brother, Eliud Ngala Mwendwa is also a former Kenyan minister.

She lives in Matinyani village in Kitui District. Nyiva Mwendwa has two children, Kavinya and Maluki.

Awards
She was awarded with The Order of the Golden Heart of Kenya, 2nd Class,   Elder of   the Golden Heart (EGH)

References

Living people
Kenya African National Union politicians
National Rainbow Coalition politicians
Wiper Democratic Movement – Kenya politicians
Members of the National Assembly (Kenya)
Government ministers of Kenya
Women government ministers of Kenya
Alumni of Alliance Girls High School
Kamba people
People from Kitui County
20th-century Kenyan women politicians
20th-century Kenyan politicians
21st-century Kenyan women politicians
21st-century Kenyan politicians
Year of birth missing (living people)